Central School of Ballet is a classical ballet school based in London, with students from countries all over the world.

The school was established in 1982 by Ann Stannard and Christopher Gable. It established a touring company, Ballet Central, in 1984. From 2004 Central started to offer degree courses accredited by the University of Kent.

References

Schools of the performing arts in the United Kingdom
Ballet schools in the United Kingdom
Educational institutions established in 1982
1982 establishments in England